Ornativalva pulchella is a moth of the family Gelechiidae. It was described by Sattler in 1976. It is found in Mongolia.

The host plant is unknown, but might be a Tamarix species.

References

Moths described in 1976
Ornativalva